Tevita Alokuoulu, Lord Fusitua (1908 – 5 October 1973) was a Tongan noble and politician.

Biography
Born in 1908, Alokuoulu acceded to the Fusituʻa title – one of the three members of the nobility of Niuafoou – in 1929 at the age of 21.

He was later elected to the Legislative Assembly as one of the nobles representing Tongatapu.

Alokuoulu died in October 1973 at the age of 65, at which point he was the longest-serving noble in Tonga.

References

1908 births
Tongan nobles
Members of the Legislative Assembly of Tonga
1973 deaths